The Estonian National Badminton Championships is a tournament organized to crown the best badminton players in Estonia. They are held since the season 1965.

Past winners

References
Badminton Europe - Details of affiliated national organisations

Badminton tournaments in Estonia
National badminton championships
Recurring sporting events established in 1965
1965 establishments in Estonia
Badminton